Henefer is a town in Summit County, Utah, United States. It is part of the Salt Lake City, Utah Metropolitan Statistical Area. The population was 766 at the 2010 census.

History
Henefer was founded in 1859. The community was named after James and William Hennefer, early citizens.

Geography

The hillside letter H can be seen in the southwest

Climate
Large seasonal temperature differences typify this climatic region, with warm to hot (and often humid) summers and cold (sometimes severely cold) winters.  According to the Köppen Climate Classification system, Henefer has a humid continental climate, abbreviated "Dfb" on climate maps.

Demographics

As of the census of 2000, there were 684 people, 219 households, and 178 families residing in the town. The population density was 797.5 people per square mile (/km2). There were 230 housing units at an average density of 268.2 per square mile (/km2). The racial makeup of the town was 97.51% White, 0.15% African American, 0.15% Native American, 0.44% Asian, 1.75% from other races. Hispanic or Latino of any race were 2.63% of the population.

There were 219 households, out of which 45.7% had children under the age of 18 living with them, 72.1% were married couples living together, 7.8% had a female householder with no husband present, and 18.3% were non-families. 17.4% of all households were made up of individuals, and 11.0% had someone living alone who was 65 years of age or older. The average household size was 3.12, and the average family size was 3.53.

In the town, the population was spread out, with 35.1% under 18, 12.1% from 18 to 24, 24.1% from 25 to 44, 18.4% from 45 to 64, and 10.2% who were 65 years of age or older. The median age was 28 years. For every 100 females, there were 103.6 males. For every 100 females aged 18 and over, there were 93.9 males.

The median income for a household in the town was $43,125, and the median income for a family was $46,667. Males had a median income of $40,000 versus $21,071 for females. The per capita income was $14,791. About 4.4% of families and 4.8% of the population were below the poverty line, including 6.6% of those under age 18 and 7.9% of those aged 65 or over.

Education
It is in the North Summit School District.

See also

 List of cities and towns in Utah

References

External links

 

Towns in Summit County, Utah
Towns in Utah
Populated places established in 1853
Salt Lake City metropolitan area
1853 establishments in Utah Territory